Kolar River may refer to:

 Kolar River (Madhya Pradesh), India
 Kolar River (Maharashtra), India